The Kaipo River is a river of New Zealand, flowing into Kaipo Bay, northern Fiordland. The river is very large. Fly fishing is popular there.

The New Zealand Ministry for Culture and Heritage gives a translation of "eat night" for Kaipō.

See also
List of rivers of New Zealand

References

Rivers of Fiordland